Hickory Creek is a town in Denton County, Texas, United States, located  north of downtown Dallas. The population of Hickory Creek has grown from 219 at its incorporation in 1963 to 3,247 at the 2010 census. It is also one of the 4 communities in the Lake Cities.

Hickory Creek was recognized by Tree City USA in August 2008.

Geography 

Hickory Creek is located at  (33.110101, –97.030546).

Demographics 

As of the census of 2000, there were 2,078 people, 776 households, and 622 families residing in the town. The population density was 458.1 people per square mile (176.7/km2). There were 808 housing units at an average density of 178.1 per square mile (68.7/km2). The racial makeup of the town was 93.46% White, 1.20% African American, 0.72% Native American, 0.72% Asian, 1.83% from other races, and 2.07% from two or more races. Hispanic or Latino of any race were 5.68% of the population.

There were 776 households, out of which 33.5% had children under the age of 18 living with them, 68.4% were married couples living together, 8.2% had a female householder with no husband present, and 19.8% were non-families. 15.2% of all households were made up of individuals, and 3.1% had someone living alone who was 65 years of age or older. The average household size was 2.68 and the average family size was 2.99.

In the town, the population was spread out, with 24.4% under the age of 18, 6.4% from 18 to 24, 30.5% from 25 to 44, 31.2% from 45 to 64, and 7.6% who were 65 years of age or older. The median age was 40 years. For every 100 females, there were 101.4 males. For every 100 females age 18 and over, there were 99.0 males.

The median income for a household in the town was $69,313, and the median income for a family was $74,107. Males had a median income of $45,885 versus $36,103 for females. The per capita income for the town was $31,683. About 3.3% of families and 4.1% of the population were below the poverty line, including 5.6% of those under age 18 and 4.0% of those age 65 or over.

Education 
Almost all of the Town of Hickory Creek is served by the Lake Dallas Independent School District. A small portion is in the Lewisville Independent School District.

Most of Hickory Creek is zoned to Lake Dallas Elementary School while some of it is zoned to Corinth Elementary School. All parts in Lake Dallas ISD are zoned to Lake Dallas Middle School and Lake Dallas High School.

See also
Champ d'Or Estate

References

External links
 Town of Hickory Creek official website
 The Lake Cities Sun, local newspaper

Dallas–Fort Worth metroplex
Towns in Denton County, Texas
Towns in Texas
Populated places established in 1963